Ontonagon County  is a county in the Upper Peninsula of the U.S. state of Michigan. As of the 2020 Census, the population was 5,816, making it Michigan's third-least populous county. The county seat is Ontonagon. The county was set off in 1843, and organized in 1848. Its territory had been organized as part of Chippewa and Mackinac counties. With increasing population in the area, more counties were organized. After Ontonagon was organized, it was split to create Gogebic County. It is also the westernmost U.S. county that uses the Eastern Time Zone.

The county is named after the Ontonagon River. The name is said to be loosely derived from an Ojibwe language  word noojitoon ziibi, meaning "hunting river." A French transliteration, Nantounagon, identified the river on a 1670 French map. Alternatively, and perhaps more accurately, it is said to be derived from the Ojibwa onagon, which means "dish" or "bowl." See List of Michigan county name etymologies.

Geography
It is the third-largest county in Michigan by area.

At a longitude of 89.5°W, it is the westernmost county in the United States contained entirely within the Eastern Time Zone.

Geographic features

 Lake of the Clouds
 Lake Superior
 Lake Gogebic is the largest lake in the Upper Peninsula.
 Corpse Pond
 Ontonagon River
 Firesteel River
 Flintsteel River
 Halfway Creek
 Townline Creek
 Maple Leaf Creek

Major highways
  – runs north–south through east-central part of county. Enters south line from Watersmeet, passes Paulding, Bruce Crossing, and Rockland, ending at Ontonagon.
  – enters east line of county at 12 miles (19 km) south of NE county corner. Runs SW, passing Mass City and Lake Mine, to intersection with M-38 east of Rockland.
  – runs east–west thru southern part of county. Enters 10.4 miles (16.6 km) north of SE county corner. Runs westerly into Gogebic County.
  – enters east line of county at a point east of Mass City. Runs west to Lake Mine, then WNW to terminus at Ontonagon.
  – runs north–south through center part of county. Enters south line on west side of Lake Gogebic; runs north to Lake Superior shoreline. Runs NE along shoreline to terminus at Ontonagon.

Airport
Ontonagon County Airport (KOGM) serves the county and surrounding communities.

Adjacent counties

 Keweenaw County – northeast
 Houghton County – east
 Iron County – southeast/CST Border
 Gogebic County – south/CST Border
 Ashland County, Wisconsin – west/CST Border
 Cook County, Minnesota – northwest/CST Border

National protected areas
 Keweenaw National Historical Park (part)
 Ottawa National Forest (part)

Demographics

The 2010 United States Census indicates Ontonagon County had a population of 6,780. This decrease of 1038 people from the 2000 United States Census represents a -13.3% change in population. In 2010 there were 3,258 households and 1,954 families in the county. The population density was 6 people per square mile (2/km2). There were 5,672 housing units at an average density of 4 per square mile (2/km2). 97.3% of the population were White, 1.1% Native American, 0.2% Asian, 0.1% Black or African American, 0.1% of some other race and 1.3% of two or more races. 0.9% were Hispanic or Latino (of any race).

There were 3,258 households, out of which 15.8% had children under the age of 18 living with them, 50.3% were married couples living together, 6.0% had a female householder with no husband present, and 40.0% were non-families. 34.8% of all households were made up of individuals, and 17.0% had someone living alone who was 65 years of age or older. The average household size was 2.06 and the average family size was 2.61.

The county population contained 15.8% under the age of 18, 4.1% from 18 to 24, 16.7% from 25 to 44, 37.0% from 45 to 64, and 26.3% who were 65 years of age or older. The median age was 52.7 years. The population is 51.6% male and 48.4% female.

The median income for a household in the county was $34,786, and the median income for a family was $46,845. The per capita income for the county was $22,195. About 9.0% of families and 14.3% of the population were below the poverty line, including 22.2% of those under age 18 and 6.7% of those age 65 or over.

History
In 1843, Michigan's Upper Peninsula was divided into Mackinac, Chippewa, Marquette, Schoolcraft, Delta, and Ontonagon Counties. In 1845, a portion of Ontonagon County was partitioned to be part of Houghton County. In 1846, the village of Ontonagon was named as the county seat of Ontonagon County.

Government
Ontonagon County is fairly balanced to Republican-leaning. Since 1876 its voters have selected the Republican Party nominee in 62% (23 of 37) of the national elections through 2020.

Ontonagon County operates the County jail, maintains rural roads, operates the major local courts, records deeds, mortgages, and vital records, administers public health regulations, and participates with the state in the provision of social services. The county board of commissioners controls the budget and has limited authority to make laws or ordinances. In Michigan, most local government functions – police and fire, building and zoning, tax assessment, street maintenance etc. – are the responsibility of individual cities and townships.

Elected officials

 Prosecuting Attorney: Michael D. Findlay
 Sheriff: Dale Rantala
 County Clerk/Register of Deeds: Stacy C. Preiss
 County Treasurer: Jeanne M. Pollard
 Mine Inspector: Douglas Roberts

As of September 2018

Communities

Village
 Ontonagon (county seat)

Civil townships

 Bergland Township
 Bohemia Township
 Carp Lake Township
 Greenland Township
 Haight Township
 Interior Township
 Matchwood Township
 McMillan Township
 Ontonagon Township
 Rockland Township
 Stannard Township

Census-designated places
 Bergland
 Bruce Crossing
 Ewen
 Greenland
 Lake Gogebic
 Mass City
 Rockland
 White Pine

Unincorporated communities

 Agate
 Algonquin
 Calderwood
 Carp Lake
 Craigsmere
 Maple Grove
 Matchwood
 Paulding
 Paynesville
 Robbins
 Trout Creek
 Victoria

Ghost town
 Adventure

Indian reservation
 The Ontonagon Indian Reservation, a branch of the Lake Superior Chippewa, has a reservation in the northeastern section of Ontonagon Township on the shores of Lake Superior.  The reservation occupies  of land but recorded no permanent population at the 2010 Census.

See also
 List of Michigan State Historic Sites in Ontonagon County, Michigan
 National Register of Historic Places listings in Ontonagon County, Michigan
 Copper Country

References

External links

 Ontonagon Chamber Of Commerce
 Ontonagon County Website

 
Michigan counties
1848 establishments in Michigan
Populated places established in 1848